Avhustivka is a village in Ukraine, in Odesa Raion, Odesa Oblast. It has a population of about 1432 (as of 2001 census). It belongs to Usatove rural hromada, one of the hromadas of Ukraine.

Until 18 July 2020, Avhustivka belonged to Biliaivka Raion. The raion was abolished in July 2020 as part of the administrative reform of Ukraine, which reduced the number of raions of Odesa Oblast to seven. The area of Biliaivka Raion was merged into Odesa Raion.

References 

Villages in Odesa Raion
Usatove Hromada